Date A Live is an anime series adapted from the light novels of the same title written by Kōshi Tachibana and illustrated by Tsunako. The story follows the adventures of Shido Itsuka and the Spirits, supernatural female entities that have fallen in love with him. The season was produced by Anime International Company and directed by Keitaro Motonaga, the first season, covering volumes 1 to 4 of the light novel series, was broadcast on Tokyo MX from April 6, 2013 to June 22, 2013. The opening theme is  sung by sweet ARMS, a vocal group consisting Iori Nomizu, Misuzu Togashi, Kaori Sadohara, and Misato.


Episode list

Notes

References

External links
  
 

1
2013 Japanese television seasons